Stadium Pirota (Stadion Pirota) is a multi-use stadium in Travnik, Bosnia and Herzegovina. It is currently used mostly for football matches and is the home ground of NK Travnik. The stadium has a capacity to hold 3,076 spectators.

References

Sports venues in Bosnia and Herzegovina
NK Travnik